Jack Brierley (1911–1984) was an Australian rugby league footballer who played in the 1930s.

A local junior from the Bexley junior rugby league football club, Brierley was graded in 1929 and went on to play a further six seasons with the St. George club before retiring in the lower grades in 1937. He is remembered as a slight, but tenacious Lock Forward. He later enjoyed a long association with the Bexley Golf Club. 

Brierley died on 26 August 1984, 26 days short of his 73rd birthday.

References

1911 births
1984 deaths
St. George Dragons players
Australian rugby league players
Rugby league locks
Rugby league players from Sydney